Justice George Kingsley Acquah  (4 March 1942 – 25 March 2007) was the twenty-third (23rd ) Chief Justice of the Supreme Court of Ghana(the eleventh since independence). He was appointed as Chief Justice on 4 July 2003 and was the incumbent until his death.

Early life

Justice Acquah was born on 4 March 1942 at Sekondi in the Western Region of the Gold Coast (now Ghana). He had his basic education in a number of schools, namely Half Assini Methodist School, Cape Coast Methodist School, Ashanti Bekwai Methodist School, Akim Oda Methodist School, Nkawkaw Methodist School and Dunkwa-on-Offin Anglican School. He attended Adisadel College at Cape Coast, from 1957 to 1963 for his secondary and sixth form (college) education. He was an undergraduate at the University of Ghana, Legon between 1964 and 1967 and obtained a B.A (Hons) degree in philosophy. In 1970, he obtained the LL.B. (Hons) degree in law from the same university. He then attended the Ghana Law School where he obtained his Professional Certificate in Law and was called to the Bar in 1972.

Working life

Justice George Acquah was in private legal practice at Cape Coast from 1972 until 19 September 1989 when he became a High Court Judge, working at Ho in the Volta Region. He rose to become an Appeal Court Judge in June 1994 and then a Supreme Court Judge a year later.

Other roles

Chairman, Budget Committee of the Judicial Service
Chairman, Judicial Service Reform and Automation Committee
Chairman, Board of Trustees of the Institute of Continuing Judicial Education of the Judicial Service of Ghana
Chairman, Disciplinary Committee of the Judicial Council
Chairman, Funeral Committee of the Judicial Service
Chairman, Tender Board of the Judicial Service
Member of the Judicial Council of Ghana
Chairman, National Multi-Sectoral Committee on the Protection of the Rights of the Child
Member, Rules of Court Committee
Member, Appointments Committee of the Judicial Council
Member, Africa Regional Council of the International Planned Parenthood Federation.
Member of the Governing Council of the Ghana Legal Literacy and Resource Foundation
Patron, Commonwealth Legal Education Association, London
Honorary Legal Adviser of the International Planned Parenthood Federation;
Editorial Advisor, Banking and Financial Law Journal of Ghana
External Examiner (Law of Evidence) Ghana Law School

Honours

June 2006 – Awarded the Order of the Star of Ghana (Member) – the highest honour of Ghana

Death

Justice Acquah died of cancer on 25 March 2007, aged 65, in Accra. He was married with six children.

See also

Chief Justice of Ghana
Judiciary of Ghana
Supreme Court of Ghana
List of judges of the Supreme Court of Ghana

References

External links

Profile on Ghanaweb.com

1942 births
2007 deaths
20th-century Ghanaian lawyers
University of Ghana alumni
Deaths from cancer in Ghana
Recipients of the Order of the Star of Ghana
Alumni of Adisadel College
Ghanaian Anglicans